The Snohomish County Council is the legislative body of Snohomish County, Washington. The county council was created in 1979 and consists of five members serving four-year terms.

Members

Notes

History

The county council was created on November 6, 1979 by Snohomish County voters as part of a home rule charter, which replaced the traditional three-member county commission with a five-member council and county executive. The first two new councilmembers was elected on March 11, 1980, joining the three existing commissioners who would continue to serve until 1983, when all seats were up for re-election.

In 2016, the county's Charter Review Commission explored expanding the council to seven members after the next redistricting. The expansion, along with requirements to hold some meetings outside of Everett and include evening meetings for public hearings, were rejected by the commission. The meetings proposal was placed on the November 2016, where it was approved by voters and came into effect the following year, requiring the county council to host at least one evening meeting in each district per year.

Structure

The council consists of five members representing five geographic districts of equal population. Each member serves a four-year term during a regular election held during November on odd-numbered years. No member can serve more than three total terms.

Candidates for a council seat must be 21 years old at the time of the election, have lived in Snohomish County for 3 years prior to filing, and be a registered voter in their district.

Districts

 District 1: Arlington, Darrington, Granite Falls, Marysville, Stanwood
 District 2: Everett, Mukilteo, Tulalip Indian Reservation
 District 3: Edmonds, Lynnwood (partial), Woodway
 District 4: Bothell (partial), Brier, Lynnwood (partial), Mill Creek, Mountlake Terrace
 District 5: Index, Lake Stevens, Monroe, Snohomish, Sultan

Districts are redrawn every ten years by an independent Districting Committee using United States Census data.

See also

King County Council

References

Snohomish County, Washington
County government in Washington (state)